Encinas de Arriba is a village and municipality in the province of Salamanca,  western Spain, part of the autonomous community of Castile-Leon.

Geography

See also
 List of municipalities in Salamanca

References

municipalities in the Province of Salamanca